Skjeggestad Bridge is the name of two parallel highway bridges on European route E18 in Holmestrand municipality, Vestfold og Telemark county, Norway.

On 2 February 2015 the southbound bridge partially collapsed. No one was injured and both bridges were closed after collapse. The collapse was caused by a landslide in the quick clay surrounding a support pillar. The southbound lane was fully destroyed in controlled explosive demolitions on 21 February and 25 March 2015. 
The northbound lane was repaired and reopened to two-way traffic on 26 June 2015. 
The southbound lane was partially reopened on 1 July and fully operational on 4 July 2016, 17 months after the collapse.

See also 
List of bridges in Norway
List of bridges in Norway by length

References 

Road bridges in Vestfold og Telemark
Holmestrand
2001 establishments in Norway
Bridges completed in 2001